Neymar is a Brazilian professional footballer who plays as a forward. Since scoring on his debut for the Brazilian national team against the United States on 10 August 2010, Neymar has gone on to record 77 goals in 124 international appearances, making him Brazil's all-time men's scorer tied with Pelé; he surpassed Ronaldo's total of 62 goals with a hat-trick in a 2022 FIFA World Cup qualification match against Peru on 14 October 2020. Neymar is also currently the sixth-highest active top scorer in men's international football.

Neymar has scored four international hat-tricks, and netted twice in a match (known as a brace) on nine occasions, with his first hat-trick coming in an 8–0 friendly win over China on 10 September 2012. He has scored nine times against Japan, making them the side he has gotten the most goals against; this total includes the four he scored during a single match in October 2015, which made Neymar the youngest player to score four goals in a game for Brazil, at the age of 22.

Neymar has scored the majority of his goals in friendlies, with them making up 46 of his overall tally. He has scored five times at the Copa América and 26 times in FIFA tournaments, which include the FIFA World Cup finals, FIFA World Cup qualifiers and the FIFA Confederations Cup.

Neymar's first senior international tournament was the 2011 Copa América, where he scored two goals for Brazil. He played in his first senior FIFA tournament two years later, when he starred for hosts Brazil in the 2013 FIFA Confederations Cup. Neymar scored four goals throughout the campaign, including in the final against Spain, helping Brazil to a 3–0 victory. Neymar received the Bronze Shoe for his four goals, and was awarded with the Golden Ball for his standout performances throughout the tournament. Neymar played at his first FIFA World Cup in 2014, where he scored four goals, placing himself as the joint-third top scorer of the competition alongside his club teammate Lionel Messi and Dutch forward Robin van Persie. He also scored twice during the 2018 World Cup.

List of goals

Brazil score listed first, score column indicates score after each Neymar goal.

Hat-tricks

Statistics

See also

 List of men's footballers with 100 or more international caps
List of men's footballers with 50 or more international goals
List of most expensive association football transfers
List of International goals scored by Pelé

References

External links 

 

Neymar
Neymar
Neymar